The 78th Pennsylvania House of Representatives District is located in south-central Pennsylvania and has been represented by Jesse Topper since 2014.

District profile
The 78th District includes all of Bedford County, Pennsylvania and all of Fulton County, Pennsylvania.

Representatives

References

Government of Bedford County, Pennsylvania
Government of Franklin County, Pennsylvania
Government of Fulton County, Pennsylvania
78